The rufous thrushes, also known as flycatcher-thrushes, are medium-sized insectivorous birds in the genus Stizorhina of the thrush family Turdidae. These are African forest dwelling species. They are sometimes placed in the genus Neocossyphus.

Species
The following species are currently recognized:

References

External links

 
 
Taxa named by Harry C. Oberholser